Ebrar Karakurt (born 17 January 2000) is a Turkish volleyball player. She is a part of the Turkey women's national volleyball team.

Volleyball career

Club
Karakurt started her volleyball career at DSİ Spor in Balıkesir. After settling in Bursa, she continued to play in her school team at Bursa Bahçeşehir Anadolu High School, and at the same time in the Bursa Büyükşehir Belediyespor. She played for Bursa BB in the 2014–15 Turkish Women's Volleyball League. She has two club licenses, which allow her to play for Bursa BB and Vakıfbank. She was a member of the youth team at Vakıfbank before she was taken to the senior team.

She was part of the Vakıfbank team, which became champion of the 2017–18 CEV Women's Champions League. She played with the Vakifbank team until moving to the Turkish team Türk Hava Yolları in 2020.

National team
She was part of the Turkey U18 team, and played at the 2017 Girls' U18 Volleyball European Championship in the Netherlands, as well as at the 2017 FIVB Volleyball Girls' U18 World Championship in Argentina. She was named one of the two Best Outside Spikers of the world tournament.

She participated at the 2017 FIVB Volleyball Women's U23 World Championship in Slovenia with the Turkey U23 team, which became the champion of the tournament.

After being admitted to the Turkey national team, she experienced many important achievements, the most current of which is the silver medal at the 2019 Women's European Championship organized in Ankara, Turkey. Before that, she played in the 2018 FIVB Volleyball Women's Nations League with her team and reached to the silver medal.

Personal life 
In August 2021 Karakurt shared a photo of herself and her girlfriend on her Instagram account. The Instagram post was published by the conservative newspaper Takvim, which called her sexual orientation and relationship "scandalous", which in turn led to her being subjected to homophobic slurs on social media. Turkish Imam Ahmet Mahmut Ünlü criticized her by saying that he "wonder[ed] what kind of troubles she could gather on [Turks]". After the attacks Karakurt has received messages of support on social media. The Turkish National Volleyball Federation spokesperson Kurtaran Mumcu supported Karakurt and criticized the homophobic comments directed at her. Demet Akalın, Eda Erdem Dündar and Naz Aydemir were among the people that have shown support to Karakurt.

Honours

Club 
2017–18 CEV Women's Champions League,2019 FIVB Club World Championship – * Bronze medal, with VakıfBank

National team
 2017 U23 World Championship-   Gold Medal
 2018 Nations League -   Silver Medal
 2019 European Championship -  Silver Medal
 2021 Nations League -   Bronze Medal
 2021 European Championship  Bronze Medal

Individual 
 2017 FIVB Girls' U18 World Championship – "Best Outside Spikers"
 2019 FIVB Nations League – "Best Outside Spikers"

References

Living people
2000 births
Sportspeople from Balıkesir
Turkish women's volleyball players
VakıfBank S.K. volleyballers
Turkey women's international volleyball players
Olympic volleyball players of Turkey
Volleyball players at the 2020 Summer Olympics
LGBT volleyball players
Turkish LGBT sportspeople
Turkish lesbians
Lesbian sportswomen